Becky Kim (born February 28, 1985) is an American synchronized swimmer who competed in the 2008 Summer Olympics.

References

1985 births
Living people
American synchronized swimmers
Olympic synchronized swimmers of the United States
Synchronized swimmers at the 2008 Summer Olympics